The River Dorn is a river in Oxfordshire, England, that is a tributary of the River Glyme.

The River Dorn flows though the Soho Farmhouse members club, part of Soho House (club) between Little Tew and Stanford St Martin.

References

Rivers of Oxfordshire
Sites of Special Scientific Interest in Oxfordshire
West Oxfordshire District
2Dorn